Mitchell Lopez (born July 17, 1993) is an American professional footballer who plays as a midfielder for Boca Raton FC in the National Premier Soccer League of the United States.

Career

Early career
Born to a Brazilian mother and a Cuban father in Miami, Florida, Mitchell grew up in Florida. At the young age of 16, he would move to Montevideo and develop his football skills in the youth teams of C.A. Bella Vista. His first team experience came in 2011, at age 18, under the orders of the coach Julio César Ribas in Deportivo Maldonado  before ultimately moving to south-American giants C.A. Penarol.

Fort Lauderdale Strikers
On March 28, 2014 Lopez signed for the Fort Lauderdale Strikers of the North American Soccer League after starting in various pre-season matches against C.A. River Plate and the Chile national team and also scoring a memorable volley against FAU. 
“Mitchell is a very hard-working young man and shows a lot of promise,” said Strikers Head Coach Günter Kronsteiner in a press release.

In his first season with the Strikers, they reached the Final of the NASL, beating the first place team of the regular season, Minnesota United FC in the semi-final before being defeated by the San Antonio Scorpions in the Championship final.

BK-46
After a short spell in Sweden's renowned AIK Mitchell signs with the top club of the Finnish kakkonen Bollklubben-46. As a midfielder, he manages 15 goals in 32 appearances, helping the club fight both seasons for promotion, falling just short.

Extremadura UD
A brief stint in Almendralejo saw Mitchell with Segunda División B title-contenders Extremadura UD under the direction of Agustin Izquierdo. In his first match for them, he started and played all 90 minutes in the 2017 Spanish Royal Federation Cup season opener.

References

External links 
 

1993 births
Living people
American soccer players
American sportspeople of Brazilian descent
American sportspeople of Cuban descent
Fort Lauderdale Strikers players
Association football midfielders
USL League Two players
North American Soccer League players
Boca Raton FC players
Soccer players from Florida
Bollklubben-46 players